At least two ships of the French Navy have been named Diligent:

 , launched in 1763 and broken up in 1780.
 , launched in 1775 as Tannah she was captured by France in 1781 and sank in 1782.

French Navy ship names